"La Wela" "('No and never') is a song recorded by the Algerian singer Yasmine Nayar in 2017 and released as a single in 2017. The song was a considerable success in its native Algeria and also managed to reach on the number one spot on a number of countries like Egypt, Syria, Jordan and Lebanon.

References 

2017 singles
Yasmine Nayar songs
2017 songs
Arabic music
Middle Eastern music
Classical and art music traditions